The Merrill Double House is an historic two family house at 18-20 West Street in Worcester, Massachusetts.  The -story Victorian Gothic Revival brick building was built c. 1879, apparently by the heirs of a local shopowner, Enoch Merrill, whose house had previously stood on the lot.  The two units are symmetrically laid out on either side of a common party wall.  The center of the main facade includes a porch that shelters the paired entrances, and each side facade includes a pavilion that rises a full three stories with a steeply pitched roof.

The house was listed on the National Register of Historic Places in 1980.

See also
National Register of Historic Places listings in northwestern Worcester, Massachusetts
National Register of Historic Places listings in Worcester County, Massachusetts

References

Gothic Revival architecture in Massachusetts
Houses completed in 1879
Houses in Worcester, Massachusetts
National Register of Historic Places in Worcester, Massachusetts
Houses on the National Register of Historic Places in Worcester County, Massachusetts